Oak Park is a station on the Chicago Transit Authority's 'L' system situated between the Ridgeland and Harlem stations on the Green Line. It is located at Oak Park Avenue and South Boulevard in the village of Oak Park, Illinois and is the closest station to the Frank Lloyd Wright Home and Studio.

History
Oak Park station was opened on January 25, 1901, by the Lake Street Elevated Railroad as a surface-level station on the line that ran parallel to the former Chicago and Northwestern Railway line (today's Union Pacific / West Line). Both lines created an unsafe grade crossing, especially as the community moved from horse-powered vehicles to the automobile. When the C&NW elevated its line between 1908 and 1909, it created a blind spot for traffic trying to cross the Lake Street Line.

On October 28, 1962, the station was elevated on an embankment and the main entrance was rebuilt by taking advantage of the small space along the road to include a ticket window and enclosed waiting rooms. When the Green Line closed for a renovation project in 1994, the CTA had planned to permanently close the Oak Park station along with four other stations (and ). However, due to the political pressure and complaints of residents, the station was retained without being rebuilt and reopened with the Green Line on May 12, 1996. When it reopened, the committee of disabled residents of Oak Park strongly protested it as one of the few stations of the Green Line that is not accessible to people with disabilities.

Bus connections

Pace
 309 Lake Street
 311 Oak Park Avenue
 313 St. Charles Road

Notes and references

Notes

References

External links
Oak Park (Lake Street Line) Station Page
Oak Park Avenue entrance from Google Maps Street View

CTA Green Line stations
Railway stations in the United States opened in 1901
Oak Park, Illinois